Kohan-e Pancharak (also known as 'Kohan) is a village in Esmaili Rural District, Esmaili District, Anbarabad County, Kerman Province, Iran. At the 2006 census, its population was 88, in 26 families.

References 

Populated places in Anbarabad County